The Governor's Cup is a trophy awarded to the victor of the annual college football game between the University of Kentucky and the University of Louisville in the state of Kentucky; it is also used as a reference to the rivalry itself.

History
Though the teams first played in 1912, they only played six times until the rivalry was suspended after the 1924 season and wasn’t renewed for another 70 years. The rivalry resumed in 1994 with a new Governor's Cup trophy which has been awarded every year since.

Kentucky leads the series 19–15. From 1994 to 2006, the game was played on the opening weekend of the college football season. In 2007, the game was moved to the third game of the season when played in Lexington but remained the first game when played in Louisville. Starting in 2014, which marked Louisville's inaugural season in the Atlantic Coast Conference, the Governor's Cup became the last game of the regular season for both teams on Thanksgiving weekend, which coincided with several other ACC-SEC same-state rivalries.

Because the Southeastern Conference, of which Kentucky is a member, decided to play a conference-only schedule for 2020 in response to the COVID-19 pandemic, the 2020 edition of the Governor's Cup game was canceled. The rivalry will continue until at least the 2030 season with Kentucky hosting in even years and Louisville hosting in odd years.

Game results

Howard Schnellenberger Award

The 2010 game was the inaugural year for the award. The award is given to the Most Valuable Player on the winning team by the Louisville Sports Commission. It is named for Howard Schnellenberger, who played under Bear Bryant for Kentucky and was Louisville's head coach when the modern football rivalry began in 1994.

See also 
 List of NCAA college football rivalry games
 Kentucky–Louisville rivalry

References

College football rivalries in the United States
College football rivalry trophies in the United States
Kentucky Wildcats football
Louisville Cardinals football
1912 establishments in Kentucky